This is a partial list of educational institutions in Mangalore (Mangaluru). Mangalore city is one of the important educational centres in India. This is due to the strong foundation of primary education laid by forefathers of undivided South Canara district.  Quality professional education offered by the twin districts of Dakshina Kannada and Udupi has attracted students from all over the country and even from abroad.

Institution 

Mangalore University
Yenepoya Deemed to be University
NITTE
National Institute of Technology Karnataka
Srinivas University
St. Aloysius College, Light House Hill
N.M.A.M. Institute of Technology, Nitte, Karkala- Autonomous Institute under VTU, Belgaum
 St. Agnes College - Autonomous Institute affiliated to Mangalore University

Engineering colleges 
 National Institute of Technology Karnataka Surathkal
 Manipal Institute of Technology Udupi
 N.M.A.M. Institute of Technology, Nitte, Udupi
 College of Engineering & Technology, Srinivas University, Mukka
 Sahyadri College of Engineering & Management, Adyar Mangalore
 P A College of Engineering, Deralakatte
 St Joseph Engineering College, Vamanjoor
 AJ Institute of Engineering and Technology, Mangalore 
 Canara Engineering College, Benjanapadavu, Bantwal
 Moodlakatte Institute of Technology, Kundapura,Udupi
 KVG College of Engineering, Sullia
 Mangalore Institute of Technology And Engineering (MITE), Moodabidri
 Alva's Institute of Engineering and Technology, Moodabidri
 Yenepoya Institute of Technology Moodabidri
 Bearys Institute of Technology, Mangalore 
 Shree Devi Institute Of Technology, Mangalore 
 Vivekananda College of Engineering & Technology, Puttur
 SDM Institute of Technology Ujire
 Srinivas Institute Of Technology Mangalore
 Shri Madhwa Vadiraja Institute of Technology & Management, Udupi
 Karavali Institute of Technology, Mangalore
 Mangalore Marine College and Technology, Mangalore

Public Health Colleges 
Edward & Cynthia Institute of Public Health - Affiliated to Mangalore University

Prasanna School of Public Health - a unit of MAHE

Medical colleges 

A J Institute of Medical Science
Father Muller Medical College
K.S. Hegde Medical Academy
Kasturba Medical College
Srinivas Institute of Medical Sciences and Research Centre
 Yenepoya Medical College

Dental colleges 

 Manipal College of Dental Sciences
 Yenepoya Dental College

Architecture 
 Nitte Institute of Architecture, under NITTE, Deralakatte

Law, arts, commerce, science & business management colleges 

 St. Agnes College, Bendore
 Canara College, Kodialbail
 University College, Hampankatta
 St. Aloysius College, Light House Hill
 St. Aloysius Evening College
 St. Agnes PU College
 College of Fisheries, Jeppina Mogaru, Gorigudda
 Govindadasa College, Suratkal
 Mangalore University, Konaje
 Pompei College Aikala, Kinnigoli
 Nitte Institute of Communication, under NITTE

High schools 
 
 St. Theresa's School, Bendur
 Red Camels Islamic School, Kelarai
 St. Gerosa High School, Jeppu
 Carmel School, Pandeshwar
 Canara High School (Main), Dongerkery
 The Yenepoya School
 Mount Carmel Central School, Maryhill
 VIBGYOR Roots and Rise School at Kulur
 Cascia High School Jeppu
 Sacred Hearts' School, Kulshekar
 Delhi Public School, MRPL
 Lourdes Central School, Mangalore
 Rosario High School, Pandeshwar
 Milagres School, Hampankatta
 Ryan International School, Kulai
 Vidyadayanee High School, Surathkal
 Cambridge School, Neermarga

References

 
Mangalore
Mangalore